The 1986–87 Southwest Missouri State Bears basketball team represented Southwest Missouri State University in National Collegiate Athletic Association (NCAA) Division I men's basketball during the 1986–87 season. Playing in the Summit League (AMCU-8) and led by head coach Charlie Spoonhour, the Bears finished the season with a 28–6 overall record and won the AMCU-8 regular season and conference tournament titles. Southwest Missouri State upset No. 4 seed Clemson, then lost to No. 5 seed Kansas in the round of 32 in the NCAA tournament.

Roster

Schedule and results

|-
!colspan=9 style=| Regular season

|-
!colspan=9 style=| AMCU-8 tournament

|-
!colspan=10 style=| NCAA tournament

Awards and honors
Winston Garland – AMCU-8 Player of the Year

References

Missouri State Bears basketball seasons
Southwest Missouri State
Missouri State Bears Basketball Team
Missouri State Bears Basketball Team
Southwest Missouri State